Western Liang may refer to the following states and territories in imperial China:

 Western Liang (Sixteen Kingdoms) (西涼) (400–421), one of the Sixteen Kingdoms located in modern Western China
 Western Liang  (555–587) (西梁), a state during the Southern and Northern Dynasties period, located in modern Central China
 Liang Province in northwestern China

 Xi Liang (official), an official in Qing China. Viceroy of several provinces.

See also
 Liang dynasty (disambiguation)
 Later Liang (disambiguation)
 Southern Liang (disambiguation)